Union Square is a skyscraper complex at Sixth Avenue between Union and University Streets in Downtown Seattle, Washington, adjacent to Freeway Park. It consists of two skyscrapers built in the 1980s and primarily used for office space. The entire complex features a 1,100-stall parking garage, a courtyard, a retail plaza spanning three stories and an underground pedestrian concourse that connects with the Fifth Avenue Theater and Rainier Square. Both structures were awarded LEED certification in 2009 and eventually received LEED Platinum certification 6 years later as a result of reduced annual energy consumption by 40 percent through recent renovations. The entire complex is currently managed by Washington Holdings, a real estate firm also known as Union Square LLC which is based in Seattle.

Buildings

One Union Square
One Union Square is an aluminum clad  skyscraper consisting of 36 floors with 2 floors below ground. Construction of this class A office building  was completed  in 1981. It is the first office building in Seattle to house all life-support systems in one location. The architect of One Union Square was TRA.

Two Union Square
Construction on Two Union Square began in 1987 and was complete by 1989. When accounting for the tip of the flag pole, the  building is the second-tallest building in the Seattle skyline. The Seattle-based architectural firm NBBJ designed the tower, which was dedicated on July 29, 1989. It is the first skyscraper to use 19,000 lbs/in.2 high-strength concrete.

Tenants

 AB Berstein
 Alston, Courtnage & Bassetti LLP
 Apex Companies, LLC
 Apple, Inc.
 AmWins
 Arboretum Mortgage
 Avenue 55
 BDO
 Bennett, Bigelow & Leedom P.S.
 BlackRock Financial
 Bush Strout & Kornfeld
 Chapter 13 Trustee
 Colliers International
 Ederer Investment Company
 Edge Asset Management
 First Choice Health
 Flinn Ferguson
 Floyd|Snider
 Frazier Healthcare
 Gordon, Tilden, Thomas, Cordell
 GreaterGood Network
 HDR, Inc.
 Homestreet Bank
 Horizon Realty Advisors, LLC
 Integra Realty Resources
 Jones Lang LaSalle
 Kidder Mathews
 Kosmos Management
 Lasher Holzapfel Sperry & Ebberson
 LBA Realty
 Littler Mendelson, PC
 Lockton
 The Lyman Group
 Marcus & Millichap
 McNaul, Ebel, Hawrot & Nelgren PLLC
 Morgan Stanley Wealth Management
 National Center for APEC
 Northwestern Mutual Financial Network
 Pacific Project Management (PPM)
 Paragon Real Estate Advisors
 Penrith Home Loans
 Pillar International Insurance Advisors
 Porter Foster Rorick LLP
 Protiviti
 Robert A. Underhill
 Robert Half International
 Sashen Ventures
 Seattle Chamber Music
 Stoel Rives LLP
 USI Insurance Services Northwest
 Wedbush Securities
 Williams Kastner
 Willis Towers Watson

See also
List of tallest buildings in the United States

References

Further reading

External links

Union Square official website
Seattle Virtual tour at Bohonus VR Photography

NBBJ buildings
Skyscraper office buildings in Seattle
Twin towers
Downtown Seattle
Office buildings completed in 1981
Office buildings completed in 1989